Nathaniel Carrington "Birdman" Taylor (September 14, 1927 – September 12, 2006) was an American football player and coach of football and basketball coach. He served as the head football coach at Morgan State University from 1974 to 1975 and again in 1982, compiling a record of 13–17–1. He also served as the head men's basketball coach at the University of Maryland Eastern Shore from 1954 to 1966 and at Morgan State during the 1989–90 season, amassing a career college basketball coaching record of 182–110.

Head coaching record

Football

References

1927 births
2006 deaths
American football quarterbacks
Maryland Eastern Shore Hawks football coaches
Maryland Eastern Shore Hawks men's basketball coaches
Morgan State Bears football coaches
Morgan State Bears men's basketball coaches
Tennessee State Tigers football players
Sportspeople from Oklahoma City
Coaches of American football from Oklahoma
Players of American football from Oklahoma
Basketball coaches from Oklahoma
African-American coaches of American football
African-American players of American football
African-American basketball coaches
20th-century African-American sportspeople
21st-century African-American sportspeople